TG Rayong Football Club (Thai ทีจี ระยอง) is a Thai semi professional football club based in Pluak Daeng District of Rayong Province. They currently play in Regional League Division 2 Central & Eastern. They was founded as Pluak Daeng in 2013, but renamed TG Rayong in 2014.

Stadium and locations

Season By Season Record

Honours
Khǒr Royal Cup (ถ้วย ข.)
Winner : 2012

References

External links
 Official Facebookpage of TG Rayong FC

Association football clubs established in 2013
Football clubs in Thailand
Rayong province
2013 establishments in Thailand